Naramata Dam is a dam near Minakami, in the Gunma Prefecture of Japan. It supports a 12.2 MW hydroelectric power station.

References

Dams in Gunma Prefecture
Dams completed in 1990